is a vertically scrolling shoot 'em up arcade game released by NMK in 1986, licensed to Jaleco. One controls a fighter jet and shoot enemies in the air and on the ground, collect power-ups, and defeat bosses to advance levels. One button is used to shoot missiles and the other is used to shoot a laser that shoots enemies and power-ups on the ground.

Reception 
In Japan, Game Machine listed Argus on their March 1, 1986 issue as being the thirteenth most-successful table arcade unit of the month.

Legacy
Argus, is one of the video games was adapted by Manga titled , published in the Gamest Comics collection from April 1999, drawn by Kouta Hirano.

Argus was released on the Nintendo Switch in the Nintendo eShop on 30 August 2018 by Hamster Corporation as part of their Arcade Archives series.

References

External links
 Argus at Arcade History
 

1986 video games
Arcade video games
Nintendo Entertainment System games
Nintendo Switch games
NMK (company) games
PlayStation 4 games
Vertically scrolling shooters
Hamster Corporation games
Multiplayer and single-player video games